Marius Viorel Ionescu (born December 18, 1984) is a Romanian long-distance runner.

Biography
At the 2012 Summer Olympics, he competed in the Men's marathon, finishing in 26th place.

Achievementes

References

External links
 

Romanian male long-distance runners
Romanian male marathon runners
1984 births
Living people
Olympic athletes of Romania
Athletes (track and field) at the 2012 Summer Olympics
World Athletics Championships athletes for Romania
Sportspeople from Craiova